Bengal Baptist Fellowship is a Baptist Christian denomination in India. It is limited to the part of India bordering Bangladesh. It has about 1300 members.

External links
 Adherents.com

Baptist denominations in India
Baptist Christianity in India
Christianity in West Bengal